George Case may refer to:
 George Case (baseball)
 George Case (slave trader)
 George Case (cricketer)
 George B. Case, co-founder of law form White & Case